= Royal Aircraft Factory A.E.2 =

A.E.2

General information
- Type: Ground attack aircraft
- National origin: United Kingdom
- Manufacturer: Royal Aircraft Factory
- Status: design study only
- Number built: none

The Royal Aircraft Factory A.E.2 (Armed or Armoured Experimental) was a proposed British armoured ground attack aircraft of the First World War.

== Design ==
The A.E.2m, conceived in 1917, was intended to be an armoured nacelle tractor biplane design. The wingspan of the aircraft would have been 42 feet 7 inches (12.98 m). However, the design never entered the hardware phase.
